A flea market (or swap meet) is a type of street market that provides space for vendors to sell previously owned (second-hand) goods. This type of market is often seasonal. However, in recent years there has been the development of 'formal' and 'casual' markets which divides a fixed-style market (formal) with long-term leases and a seasonal-style market with short-term leases. Consistently, there tends to be an emphasis on sustainable consumption whereby items such as used goods, collectibles, antiques and vintage clothing can be purchased.

Flea market vending is distinguished from street vending in that the market alone, and not any other public attraction, brings in buyers. There are a variety of vendors: some part-time who consider their work at flea markets a hobby due to their possession of an alternative job; full-time vendors who dedicate all their time to their stalls and collection of merchandise and rely solely on the profits made at the market. Vendors require skill in following retro and vintage trends, as well as selecting merchandise which connects with the culture and identity of their customers.

In the United States, the National Association of Flea Markets was established in 1998, which provides various resources for sellers, suppliers and buyers and also provides a means for suppliers and sellers to communicate and form affiliations.

Origin of the term 

While the concept has existed for millennia, the origins of the term flea market are disputed. According to one theory, the Fly Market in 18th-century New York City, located at Maiden Lane near the East River in Manhattan, began the association. The land on which the market took place was originally a salt marsh with a brook, and by the early 1800s the Fly Market was the city's principal market.

A second theory maintains that flea market is a common English calque from the French marché aux puces, which literally translates to "market with fleas", labelled as such because the items sold were previously owned and worn, likely containing fleas. The first reference to this term appeared in two conflicting stories about a location in Paris in the 1860s which was known as the "marché aux puces".

The traditional and most-publicized story is in the article "What Is a Flea Market?" by Albert LaFarge in the 1998 winter edition of Today's Flea Market magazine: 

The second story appeared in the book Flea Markets, published in Europe by Chartwell Books, reading in its introduction:

Regional names
In the United States, an outdoor swap meet is the equivalent of a flea market. However, an indoor swap meet is the equivalent of a bazaar, a permanent, indoor shopping center open during normal retail hours, with fixed booths or storefronts for the vendors.

Different English-speaking countries use various names for flea markets. In Australian English, they are also called 'trash and treasure markets'. In Philippine English, the word is tianggê from the word tianguis via Mexican Spanish coming from Nahuatl. Despite common misconception, it is not derived from Hokkien. The word supplants the indigenous term talipapâ. In India, it is known as gurjari or shrukawadi bazaar or even as juna bazaar in Pune.

In the United Kingdom, they are known as car boot sales if the event takes place in a field or car park, as the vendors will sell goods from the boot (or 'trunk' in American English) of their car. If the event is held indoors, such as a school or church hall, then it is usually known as either a jumble sale, or a bring and buy sale. In Quebec and France, they are often called Marché aux puces (literally "flea market"), while in French-speaking areas of Belgium, the name brocante or vide-grenier is normally used.

In German, there are many words in use but the most common word is "Flohmarkt", meaning literally "flea market". The same applies to Dutch "vlooienmarkt", Swedish "loppmarknad" and Finnish "kirpputori". In the predominantly Cuban/Hispanic areas of South Florida, they are called [el] pulguero ("[the] flea store") from pulga, the Spanish word for fleas. In the Southern part of Andalusia, due to the influence of Gibraltar English, they are known as "piojito", which means "little louse". In Chile they can be called persas or mercados persa ("persian market") and ferias libres, if mostly selling fruit and vegetables. In Argentina are most likely called "feria artesanal" (artisan's or street fair) or "feria americana" (American fair), the latter name is due to have taken the idea from their United States counterpart.

An ancient village on the bank of Sebou River by the name  "Juta" may have been a big medieval market.

Gallery

See also 

 Agora
 Braderie
 Car boot sale
 Charity shop
 Farmers' market
 Garage sale
 Hamfest
 Pasar malam
 White elephant sale

References

External links 

 
 World's best flea markets directory at fleamapket
 Flea market stories and tips at Flea Market Insiders
 National Flea Market Association (United States)
 let's keep in touch with Flea Market Paris

Retail markets
Non-store retailing
Reuse
Calques